Joyce Christ (7 March 1921 in Waverley, New South Wales – 17 October 1997 in Arncliffe, New South Wales) was an Australian cricket player. She played eight Test matches for the Australia national women's cricket team.

References

1921 births
1997 deaths
Australia women Test cricketers